A horse culture is a tribal group or community whose day-to-day life revolves around the herding and breeding of horses. Beginning with the domestication of the horse on the steppes of Eurasia, the horse transformed each society that adopted its use. Notable examples are the Mongols of Mongolia, the Scythian and Turkic nomads of Central Asia, and the Plains Indians and the Indians of the Puelmapu after horses were imported from Europe, particularly from Spain, during the 16th century.

History 
History offers many examples of horse cultures, such as the Huns and other peoples in Europe and Asia. Horse cultures tend to place a great deal of importance on horses and by their very nature are nomadic and usually hunter-gatherer or nomadic pastoralist societies. For example, the arrival of the horse in the Americas altered the culture of the Plains Indians. The horse increased mobility; the ability of the horse to cover a lot of ground in a very short period of time allowed native people to easily move from place to place, bringing on a nomadic shift in their culture, with an impact on transportation, trade, hunting and warfare.

However, there were also disadvantages to adopting horse culture, such as the increased responsibility of caring for the horses and keeping them healthy. Social structures of the community also had to shift to accommodate the physical space for horses to graze and feed easily.

See also
 Horse culture in Mongolia
 Horse worship
 Livestock
 Nomadic empire

External links
 Orland Ned Eddins, "Spanish Colonial Horse and the Plains Indian Culture"

References

Anthropological categories of peoples
Horses in culture
Indigenous culture of the Great Plains